The Wheatsheaf is a public house at Mill Lane, St Helens, Merseyside WA9 4HN, England.
It was built in 1936–1938 by the brewery Greenall Whitley & Co. Ltd of Warrington, to a design by the architect W. A. Hartley.

The building was Grade II listed in 2015 by Historic England as part of a drive to protect some of the country's best interwar pubs. The building was described as an example of "Brewers' Tudor", a type of Tudor Revival architecture. It is also included in CAMRA's National Inventory of Historic Pub Interiors.

The pub was built as part of a reform movement to replace "drinking dens" with more civilized drinking. The granting of a licence for the new pub was conditional upon the surrender of the licences of three other public houses in the locality: the Crystal Palace, the Engine and Tender and the Wheatsheaf Hotel. There is a bowling green outside.

See also
For similarly-named pubs in London see 
 The Wheatsheaf, Fitzrovia
 The Wheatsheaf, Southwark

References

External links
http://www.thewheaty.com/

Pubs in Merseyside
Grade II listed pubs in England
National Inventory Pubs
Tudor Revival pubs
Buildings and structures in St Helens, Merseyside
Bowling greens in England